Dominic Karl Manalo Roque (born July 20, 1990) is a Filipino actor and model. He is best known for his role in Aryana and May Isang Pangarap. He is managed by ABS-CBN's Star Magic talents.

Early life and education
Roque was born and raised in the province of Cavite, Philippines. He is the son of a businessman and a company president. He is also a nephew of actress Beth Tamayo. He attended high school in Imus Institute, Batch 2007, and earned a Tourism degree at De La Salle–College of Saint Benilde.

Career

Modelling
Dominic began modeling and endorsing several companies before heading into acting. He is a model of Cosmopolitan Talent Agency since 2008, and modeled for the Philippine clothing brand, Penshoppe.

Acting
In 2010, Roque debuted onscreen in the soap opera Habang May Buhay playing Mark. He later took his first major role in the fantasy-drama series, Aryana in 2012. He played the character Hubert, wherein he co-starred and was paired with Ella Cruz.

While taping the series, he did several guesting roles including Bandila and in the morning talk show Kris TV in which he spoke about issues relating to Kathryn Bernardo.

After Aryana ended in January 2013, he signed his second major role in the noontime drama series May Isang Pangarap where he played the arrogant Alvin. He was paired with Erin Ocampo, an up-and-coming female actress.

In June 2013, Roque had his movie debut in the film Pagpag, an MMFF entry for 2013. He co-starred with Daniel Padilla and Kathryn Bernardo.

On December 25, 2016, Roque starred as Fabian in a horror-thriller film entitled Seklusyon, which was an entry to the 2016 Metro Manila Film Festival. The film received a total of 8 awards; the highest number awarded to a film in the competition.

Filmography

Television

Movies

References

External links

 

1990 births
Living people
De La Salle–College of Saint Benilde alumni
Male actors from Cavite
People from Cavite City
Tagalog people
Filipino male models
Star Magic